The Hours of Jeanne de Navarre is an illuminated book of hours with miniatures painted by Jean Le Noir. The book was commissioned by Philip VI of Valois and his wife, Blanche de Navarre, for Jeanne de Navarre, Queen of Navarre. The book was created sometime between 1336 and 1340 and is now in the Bibliothèque Nationale, Paris.

Notes

References 
De Hamel, Christopher (2017). Meetings with Remarkable Manuscripts. Penguin Books.

1330s books
14th-century illuminated manuscripts
Jeanne de Navarre
Bibliothèque nationale de France collections